Yoldia is a genus of saltwater clams, marine bivalve mollusks in the family Yoldiidae. It was named after Alfonso de Aguirre y Yoldi, Conde de Yoldi (1764–1852), a Spanish nobleman in charge of the royal naturalistic collection of Denmark.

Species
Species within the genus Yoldia include:
 Yoldia aeolica (Valenciennes, 1846)
 Yoldia amygdalea Valenciennes, 1846
 Yoldia aurata Lan & Lee, 2001
 Yoldia bartschi Scarlato, 1981
 Yoldia cooperii Gabb, 1865
 Yoldia glauca Kuroda & Habe in Habe, 1961
 Yoldia hyperborea (Gould, 1841)
 Yoldia johanni Dall, 1925
 Yoldia keppeliana G. B. Sowerby III, 1904
 Yoldia kikuchii Kuroda, 1929
 Yoldia lata (Hinds, 1843)
 Yoldia limatula (Say, 1831)
 Yoldia micrometrica Seguenza G., 1877
 Yoldia myalis (Couthouy, 1838)
 Yoldia notabilis Yokoyama, 1922
 Yoldia pygmaea (Muenster, 1835)
 Yoldia sapotilla (Gould, 1841)
 Yoldia similis Kuroda & Habe in Habe, 1961
 Yoldia thraciaeformis Storer, 1838
 Yoldia toporoki Scarlato, 1981

References

Yoldiidae
Bivalve genera